The 1910 Colorado Silver and Gold football team was an American football team that represented the University of Colorado as a member of the Rocky Mountain Conference (RMC) during the 1910 college football season. In its tenth year under head coach Fred Folsom, the team compiled a 6–0 record (3–0 against RMC opponents), shut out five of six opponents, won the conference championship, and outscored opponents by a total of 121 to 3.

Colorado sustained a 21-game win streak that began on November 26, 1908, and ended on October 12, 1912. It remains the longest such streak in program history.

The 1910 season was the first for the newly-named Rocky Mountain Conference, which had previously been the Colorado Faculty Athletic Conference, but was renamed with the addition of two schools (Utah and Wyoming) from outside Colorado.

Schedule

References

Colorado
Colorado Buffaloes football seasons
College football undefeated seasons
Rocky Mountain Athletic Conference football champion seasons
Colorado Silver and Gold football